Rexel Ryan Fabriga is a competitive diver. He was born on October 2, 1985, in Zamboanga, Philippines, where he grew up.

Career
Coached by Chinese diving guru Zhang Dehu, Ryan first made his mark in the international diving scene when he was a surprise finalist, finishing 5th in the Men's 10m platform event of the FINA Diving Grand Prix event held in Texas, USA. This event had Olympic finalists and World medalists in the start order.

He went on a roll and won 2 gold medals in the 2003 Southeast Asian Games held in Vietnam which made him the first Filipino diver to bring home gold medals in a major international event. In the 2005 Southeast Asian Games, he won the gold in synchronized 10m platform together with Kevin Kong and a silver in 10m individual platform. He again defended the 10m synchronized platform gold for the 3rd time with Jaime Asok in the 2007 Southeast Asian Games held in Thailand while settling for another silver for the Philippines in the 10m individual platform event.

Ryan qualified for the 2008 Beijing Summer Olympic Games and ranked 28th in the Men's Individual 10meter platform event.

In 2009, he competed in the 2009 Southeast Asian Games in Laos and took home a silver medal in the synchronized platform and a bronze medal in the synchronized platform event. Ryan was primed to compete in the 2010 Asian Games in Guangzhou, China but had to withdraw due to an injury sustained during a vehicular accident on their way to the Aquatics Center. After assessing his injuries and his preparations for a run at qualifying for the 2012 London Olympics, he soon semi-announced his retirement from active competition.

References

Filipino male divers
Olympic divers of the Philippines
Divers at the 2008 Summer Olympics
Living people
Sportspeople from Zamboanga City
Divers at the 2010 Asian Games
Divers at the 2006 Asian Games
Divers at the 2002 Asian Games
Southeast Asian Games gold medalists for the Philippines
Southeast Asian Games medalists in diving
Year of birth missing (living people)
Competitors at the 2003 Southeast Asian Games
Competitors at the 2005 Southeast Asian Games
Competitors at the 2007 Southeast Asian Games
Competitors at the 2009 Southeast Asian Games
Asian Games competitors for the Philippines
21st-century Filipino people